Bhagadatta was a king of the ancient Indian kingdom of Pragjyotisha. Bhagadatta may also refer to:

Bhagadatta (Langkasuka), a 6th-century King of the Langkasuka empire
Bhagadatta (of Chanasa), a 10th-century King of Dvaravati
Bhagadatta austenia, an (older) alternative name of the butterfly species Limenitis austenia